John James McGuinness (born 15 March 1955) is an Irish Fianna Fáil politician who has been a Teachta Dála (TD) for the Carlow–Kilkenny constituency since the 1997 general election. He was appointed Chair of the Committee on Finance, Public Expenditure and Reform, and Taoiseach in April 2016. He served as Chair of the Public Accounts Committee from 2011 to 2016 and as a Minister of State from 2007 to 2009.

Personal life
McGuinness was born in Kilkenny and educated in Kilkenny Christian Brothers Secondary School. He holds a Diploma in Business Management. He is married to Margaret Redmond and they have three sons and one daughter. His eldest son Andrew is a Fianna Fáil County Councillor on Kilkenny County Council and served as Mayor from 2014 to 2015.

Political career
He first entered local politics in 1979 when he won a seat on Kilkenny Borough Council and was a subsequent mayor of the city from 1996 to 1997. He was the third generation of his family to serve on this council. From 1991 until the abolition of the dual mandate in 2003, he was also member of Kilkenny County Council, where his father, Michael McGuinness, was the longest-serving councillor (1959–99).

He was first elected to Dáil Éireann as a Fianna Fáil TD for the Carlow–Kilkenny constituency at the 1997 general election. He was vice-chairperson of the Public Accounts Committee in the 29th Dáil and a member of the Joint Oireachtas Committees for European Affairs, Enterprise and Small Business, Justice, and Women's Rights in the 28th Dáil.

In July 2007, he was appointed by the government on the nomination of Taoiseach Bertie Ahern as Minister of State at the Department of Enterprise, Trade and Employment with responsibility for Trade and Commerce. He was re-appointed by the government on the nomination of Taoiseach Brian Cowen to the same position on 13 May 2008. On 22 April 2009, as part of cost-cutting measures due to the Irish financial crisis, the Cowen reduced the number of Ministers of State from 20 to 15. McGuinness was among the seven junior ministers who were not reappointed.

McGuinness then revealed a testy relationship with his senior minister Mary Coughlan, and considerable disagreement with policy in the department. On 24 April 2009, he criticised Coughlan and Cowen for their lack of leadership being given to the country. He said: "She's not equipped to deal with the complex issues of dealing with enterprise and business within the department. And neither is the department". McGuinness later rejected suggestions he campaigned to undermine Coughlan, when it was revealed that he had hired external PR advice in an effort to enhance his own profile as a Minister of State within the department.

In 2010, a political memoir that he co-wrote with Naoise Nunn, called The House Always Wins, was published by Gill & Macmillan.

In the 31st Dáil, McGuinness served as Chair of the Public Accounts Committee. He was the Fianna Fáil Spokesperson on Small Business and Regulatory Framework from April 2011 to March 2016.

He declared that he would vote No in the 2015 referendum to allow same-sex marriage.

In the 32nd Dáil, McGuinness served as Chair of the Finance, Public Expenditure and Reform, and Taoiseach Committee.

He chairs the Ireland-Taiwan Parliamentary Friendship Association.

References

External links

John McGuinness' page on the Fianna Fáil website

1955 births
Living people
Fianna Fáil TDs
Local councillors in County Kilkenny
Kilkenny
Members of the 28th Dáil
Members of the 29th Dáil
Members of the 30th Dáil
Members of the 31st Dáil
Members of the 32nd Dáil
Members of the 33rd Dáil
Ministers of State of the 30th Dáil
People from Kilkenny (city)